In enzymology, an inosine nucleosidase is an enzyme that catalyzes the chemical reaction

inosine + H2O  D-ribose + hypoxanthine

Thus, the two substrates of this enzyme are inosine and H2O, whereas its two products are D-ribose and hypoxanthine.

This enzyme belongs to the family of hydrolases, specifically those glycosylases that hydrolyse N-glycosyl compounds.  The systematic name of this enzyme class is inosine ribohydrolase. Other names in common use include inosinase, and inosine-guanosine nucleosidase.  This enzyme participates in purine metabolism.

References 

 
 

EC 3.2.2
Enzymes of unknown structure